Feind im Blut (English: Enemy in the Blood) is a 1931 Swiss-German drama film directed by Walter Ruttmann. It tells three stories about people who become infected with syphilis. There are also documentary parts with information about the disease. The film was co-produced with several organisations focused on combatting sexually transmitted infections.

Plot
A student learns that his girlfriend has been unfaithful. He goes out in the city nightlife together with a friend. The friend spends the night with a waitress and catches syphilis.

A mechanic tries to cure his syphilis by going to a quack. It does not help him. His wife gives birth to a child infected with the disease and commits suicide.

A married woman attends dancing classes. There she meets a young man who gives her syphilis.

Cast
 Gerhard Bienert as mechanic
 Ilse Stobrawa as mechanic's wife
 Wolfgang Klein as student
 Walburga Gmür as student's girlfriend Lili
 Helmut Krauss as student's friend
 Margarete Kupfer as quack
 Ruth Albu as married woman

Production
The film was made to inform and warn the public about syphilis. Filming took place from 9 February to 27 March 1931 in Berlin and Zürich, with studio scenes in the Lignose-Hörfilm Atelier and Grunewald-Atelier in Berlin.

Release
The film was released in Germany on 14 April 1931. It premiered in Switzerland on 18 April the same year.

References

External links
 

1931 documentary films
1930s educational films
Films about syphilis
Films directed by Walter Ruttmann
Films of the Weimar Republic
German documentary films
German drama films
1930s German-language films
Swiss documentary films
Swiss drama films
German black-and-white films
Swiss black-and-white films
1931 drama films
1931 films
1930s German films